Cut Me may refer to:

"Cut Me", a song by Coldrain from the 2022 album Nonnegative
"Cut Me", a song by Moses Sumney from the 2020 album Græ
"Cut Me", a song by Mushroomhead from the 2006 album Savior Sorrow